Shawn Vere Gore (born April 12, 1987), is a retired professional Canadian football wide receiver. Gore spent the majority of his professional career playing for the BC Lions of the Canadian Football League. He was drafted tenth overall by the Lions in the 2010 CFL Draft, but signed with the Green Bay Packers of the National Football League on the day after the draft as a free agent. He played college football for the Bishop's Gaiters, and high school football for the Newtonbrook North Stars.

Professional career

Green Bay Packers

Gore was released from the Packers on August 28, 2010 without ever playing an NFL regular season game.

BC Lions

Soon after, on September 5, 2010, it was announced that Gore had signed with the BC Lions. After a strong performance in the Lions' 2011 training camp, Gore earned a starting position on offence as a receiver.

On January 13, 2013, after trying out for three NFL teams it was announced that Gore decided to re-sign with the Lions under a three-year deal. On May 4, 2017, at the age of 30, Gore announced his retirement from professional football on the same day he was sworn in as a member of the Vancouver Police Department. He finished his CFL career having played for six seasons, accumulating 307 receptions for 3,911 yards and 20 touchdowns over 113 games.

References

External links
 
 BC Lions profile
 Canadian Football League profile
 
 

1987 births
Living people
BC Lions players
Bishop's Gaiters football players
Canadian football wide receivers
Players of Canadian football from Ontario
Canadian football people from Toronto
Black Canadian players of Canadian football
Green Bay Packers players